The following highways are numbered 40A:

United States
 County Road 40A (Levy County, Florida)
 County Route 40A (Monmouth County, New Jersey)
 New York State Route 40A (former)
 County Route 40A (Dutchess County, New York)
 County Route 40A (Steuben County, New York)
 County Route 40A (Suffolk County, New York)
 Oklahoma State Highway 40A
 South Dakota Highway 40A (former)